Robin Black is a Canadian mixed martial arts commentator, former mixed martial artist, and glam rock musician.

History
Originally a member of the Pinawa, Manitoba band Ballroom Zombies, Robin Black moved to Toronto in 1998 to form Robin Black and the Intergalactic Rock Stars.

The band released their first recording, a novelty CD single cut in the shape of a star, in 2000. The album Planet Fame, produced by Moe Berg and Garth Richardson, followed on February 14, 2002. It was filled with  glam rock tracks, led by the single "So Sick of You". A video for the single was also released.

Prior to the release of their second album, the band brought in two new members; Chris "The Kidd" Avolos on drums and John "The Creep" Kerns on bass. The 2005 album was named Instant Classic, and was produced by Bob Ezrin along with Garth Richardson. For this release the band's name was shortened to just Robin Black. They toured extensively for this release, including internationally.

Frontman Robin also made an appearance on Showcase's TV series KinK. Black was also a judge on the 2006 Much Music VJ Search. He holds a second degree black belt in Tae Kwon Do. Robin also won his division at the 2008 NAGA World Championships. He now trains MMA at Xtreme Couture in Toronto alongside other professional MMA fighters such as Mark Hominick, Mark Bocek, and Rob Di Censo and retired from professional MMA with a 4-5 record.

Robin Black toured the UK again across July and August 2008 with support from German glam rock band The Pleasures and British based Patchwork Grace. This tour culminated in a headline show at Trash Stock festival, Nottingham.

Mixed martial arts

Robin Black is a practitioner of Tae Kwon Do and Brazilian Jiu-Jitsu. He was featured on a MuchMusic program titled "Robin Black: Cage Fighter". On the program, Black trained with  mixed martial artists Georges St-Pierre, Sam Stout, Mark Hominick, Dan Smith, Charlotte Savage, and Andrew Bradbury.

Black was also a guest commentator at an XMMA show in Montreal featuring David Loiseau. This marked the first time that Robin did color commentary for fights.  Robin has since been brought in to interview fighters between rounds at Warrior-1 MMA - Inception, WRECK MMA, CFC and others.

In 2009, Black submitted opponent Stephane Poirier to become the first ever 135 pound Champion in Canada's ELITE 1 MMA promotion.

After a near 2-year hiatus, Robin returned to the cage at the inaugural SLAMM: Tristar Fights event on November 30, 2012, submitting opponent Derek Charbonneau via Kimura armlock in the 2nd round, bringing his MMA record to 4-5 (W-L).

Members

Current
ROBIN BLACK
Robin Black - vocals
Peter Arvidsson - lead guitar, backing vocals
Chris "Starboy" Cunnane - guitar, backing vocals
Robby Ruckus (who also plays in Darlings of Chelsea) - bass
Aaron Verdonk - Drums (who also plays in Stereos)

Former

Robin Black and the Intergalactic Rock Stars
(1998-2002)
Robin Black - lead vocals
Stacy Stray - lead guitar, backing vocals
Chris "Starboy" Cunnane - guitar, keyboards, backing vocals
jackie Duncan - bass (may-sept. 98)
Killer Ky Anto - bass (sept. 98-May 2002)
Kevin Taylor aka K-Tron - drums

Robin Black and the Intergalactic Rock Stars
(2002-2003)
Robin Black - lead vocals
Killer Ky Anto - lead guitar, backing vocals
Chris "Starboy" Cunnane - guitar, keyboards, backing vocals
B.B. McQueen - bass
Kevin Taylor - drums

Robin Black and the Intergalactic Rock Stars
(2003-2006)
Robin Black - lead vocals
Chris "Starboy" Cunnane - guitar, keyboards, backing vocals
John "The Creep" Kerns - bass
Chris "The Kid" Avolos - drums

Discography

Albums
 Planet:Fame (2002)
 Instant Classic (2005)

Singles
 "Star Shaped Single" (2000)
 "Two Song Tease" (2004)
 "Hellraiser" (2003) (UK only release)

DVDs
 We Came, We Saw...We Came! (DVD, 2002)

Videos

Awards and recognition
 Lethwei World
 2019 Analyst of the year
Spia Asia Awards
 2019 Best Sport Tourism Destination Campaign of the Year - Bronze 
Asian Academy Awards
 2019 Best Sport Program - National Winner

Mixed martial arts record

|-
| Win
| align=center| 4-5
| Derek Charbonneau
| Submission (Americana)
| Slamm 1 - Garcia vs. Lamarche
| 
| align=center| 2
| align=center| 2:34
| Montreal, Quebec, Canada
|
|-
| Loss
| align=center| 3-5
| Mike Reilly
| Submission (armbar)
| Wreck MMA - Strong and Proud
| 
| align=center| 1
| align=center| 0:57
| Casino du Lac-Leamy, Gatineau, Quebec, Canada
|
|-
| Loss
| align=center| 3-4
| Eric Perez
| TKO (punches)
| CFC - Canadian Fighting Championship 5
| 
| align=center| 1
| align=center| 1:23
| Winnipeg Convention Centre, Winnipeg, Manitoba, Canada
|
|-
| Win
| align=center| 3-3
| Matt Knysh
| TKO (punches)
| AMMA 2 - Vengeance
| 
| align=center| 2
| align=center| 1:20
| Edmonton Expo Centre, Edmonton, Alberta, Canada
|
|-
| Loss
| align=center| 2-3
| Corey Lautischer
| Submission (guillotine choke)
| AMMA 1 - First Blood
| 
| align=center| 1
| align=center| 0:31
| Edmonton Expo Centre, Edmonton, Alberta, Canada
|
|-
| Win
| align=center| 2-2
| Stephane Poirier
| Submission (rear-naked choke)
| Elite 1 - Never Back Down
| 
| align=center| 1
| align=center| 1:31
| Moncton, New Brunswick, Canada
|
|-
| Win
| align=center| 1-2
| Stephane Poirier
| Submission (triangle choke)
| CFC - Canadian Fighting Championship 1
| 
| align=center| 1
| align=center| 2:57
| Winnipeg, Manitoba, Canada
|
|-
| Loss
| align=center| 0-2
| Janz Stein
| Submission (rear-naked choke)
| UCW 14 - November to Remember
| 
| align=center| 1
| align=center| 1:36
| Winnipeg, Manitoba, Canada
|
|-
| Loss
| align=center| 0-1
| Chris Myra
| Submission (triangle choke)
| Freedom Fight - Title Quest
| 
| align=center| 2
| align=center| 1:15
| Gatineau, Quebec, Canada
|

References

External links
 MySpace

Mixed martial arts broadcasters
Mixed martial artists utilizing taekwondo
Mixed martial artists utilizing Brazilian jiu-jitsu
Canadian rock singers
Canadian male singers
Musicians from Toronto
Living people
Participants in Canadian reality television series
Canadian male taekwondo practitioners
Canadian practitioners of Brazilian jiu-jitsu
Canadian male mixed martial artists
Year of birth missing (living people)